School of the Arts may refer to:

United States

California
 Coronado School of the Arts, Coronado
 Los Angeles County High School for the Arts
 Orange County High School of the Arts, Santa Ana
 Roosevelt School of the Arts, Fresno
 San Diego School of Creative and Performing Arts
 San Francisco School of the Arts

New York
 Brooklyn High School of the Arts
 Columbia University School of the Arts, New York City
 Frank Sinatra School of the Arts, Long Island City
 School of the Arts (Rochester, New York)

Other states
 Charleston County School of the Arts, South Carolina
 Denver School of the Arts, Colorado
 Douglas Anderson School of the Arts, Jacksonville, Florida
 Dreyfoos School of the Arts, West Palm Beach, Florida
 Duke Ellington School of the Arts, Washington, D.C.
 Durham School of the Arts, North Carolina
 North Carolina School of the Arts
 Tacoma School of the Arts, Washington
 York County School of the Arts, Virginia

Other countries
 College of the Arts, Windhoek, Namibia
 School of the Arts, Singapore
 Victoria School of the Arts, Edmonton, Canada

See also
 List of art schools
 School of Art and Design (disambiguation)
 School of Arts (disambiguation)
 School of Creative and Performing Arts (disambiguation)
 SOA (disambiguation)